The 1983 Indiana Hoosiers football team represented Indiana University Bloomington during the 1983 Big Ten Conference football season. Led by Sam Wyche in his first and only season as head caoch, the Hoosiers compiled an overall record of 3–8 with a mark of 2–7 in conference play, tying for eighth place in the Big Ten. The team played home games at Memorial Stadium in Bloomington, Indiana.

Schedule

Personnel

Season summary

Purdue

1984 NFL draftees

References

Indiana
Indiana Hoosiers football seasons
Indiana Hoosiers football